Christopher Bates is a former British lightweight rower.

Rowing career
Bates was three times world champion; twice with the lightweight men's four (in 1991 in Vienna and in 1992 in Montreal) and once with the lightweight men's eight (in 1994 in Indianapolis). He represented England and won a gold medal in the lightweight coxless four, at the 1986 Commonwealth Games in Edinburgh, Scotland.

He was part of the coxless pairs crew, with Peter Haining, that won the national title rowing for Nottinghamshire County Rowing Association, at the 1988 National Rowing Championships.

References

Year of birth missing (living people)
Living people
British male rowers
World Rowing Championships medalists for Great Britain
Commonwealth Games medallists in rowing
Commonwealth Games gold medallists for England
Rowers at the 1986 Commonwealth Games
Medallists at the 1986 Commonwealth Games